"Suavecito" is a song recorded by Malo in 1971. It was the lead single from their debut LP, Malo.

Background
Suavecito means "soft" or "smooth" in Spanish.  The song has been called "The Chicano National Anthem".

Chart history
The song was the band's biggest hit: the only one U.S. Top-20 (#18) and Canada (#14) during the spring of 1972. It also reached #8 on the U.S. Adult Contemporary chart.

References

External links
 

1971 songs
1972 singles
Warner Records singles